Unseen is a 2023 American horror thriller film directed by Yoko Okumura in her directorial debut and written by Salvatore Cardoni and Brian Rawlins. The film stars Midori Francis, Jolene Purdy and Missi Pyle. Jason Blum serves as an executive producer through his Blumhouse Television banner.

The film was released digitally on March 7, 2023 by MGM+ and Paramount Home Entertainment and will stream on MGM+ on May 19, 2023.

Plot
Gas station clerk Sam receives a call from Emily, a nearly blind woman who is running from her murderous ex in the woods. Emily must survive the ordeal with Sam being her eyes from afar using a video call.

Cast
 Missi Pyle as Carol
 Midori Francis as Emily
 Jolene Purdy as Sam 
 Ren Hanami as Mom
 Michael Patrick Lane as Charlie

Production
In March 2022, Unseen was announced as part of Blumhouse Television and Epix's TV film deal, with Yoko Okumura directing with Salvatore Cardoni and Brian Rawlins writing the screenplay and Midori Francis, Jolene Purdy and Michael Patrick Lane starring in the film. Jason Blum serves as an executive producer through his Blumhouse Television banner.

Filming
Principal photography on the film began in January 2022 in New Orleans.

Release
The film was released on March 7, 2023 by MGM+ and Paramount Home Entertainment and will stream on MGM+ on May 19, 2023.

Reception

References

External links
 

American horror thriller films
2023 horror thriller films
Blumhouse Productions films
MGM+ original films
Films shot in New Orleans
Films produced by Jason Blum
Films about blind people
2023 films
2023 horror films
2023 directorial debut films
2020s English-language films